The Rotterdam class are two landing platform dock (LPD) ships in service with the Dutch Navy. Built by Damen Schelde Naval Shipbuilding at Vlissingen, their mission is to carry out amphibious warfare by transporting the bulk of the Korps Mariniers. These ships have both a large helicopter flight deck and a well deck for large landing craft, as well as space for up to 33 main battle tanks.

Rotterdam and Johan de Witt are based at the Nieuwe Haven Naval Base in Den Helder, the Netherlands.

The class is the result of a joint project between Spain and the Netherlands for developing a common class of LPD that would fulfill the needs of both countries to replace older ships.

Design and description
The project began in the Netherlands in 1990 as the Dutch navy sought a solution to their LPD requirements. Spain joined the project in July 1991 and the definition stage was completed by December 1993. The Rotterdam class spawned from the joint Enforcer design with the Dutch lead ship being authorised on 29 July 1994. The LPDs were designed to transport a battalion of marines and disembark them offshore and general logistic support.

The ships are equipped with a large helicopter deck for helicopter operations and a dock for large landing craft. The ships have a complete Echelon II hospital – a step above a first aid unit, but below a fully-functional hospital – including an operating theater and intensive care facilities with ten beds. A surgical team can be stationed on board. The ship also has a desalination system enabling it to convert seawater into drinking water.

Ships in class

Construction and career
The first ship, named Rotterdam, was ordered in April 1994 and laid down by Damen Schelde Naval Shipbuilding at their shipyard in Vlissingen, the Netherlands on 23 February 1996. The second vessel, named Johan de Witt, was ordered in May 2002 and laid down on 18 June 2003. Rotterdam was commissioned on 22 February 1997 and Johan de Witt on 30 November 2007. Both ships are based at Nieuwe Haven Naval Base, Den Helder.

In October 2012, while serving as the flagship for Operation Ocean Shield, Rotterdam sank a suspected Somali pirate ship off the east coast of Africa. Rotterdam came under sustained attack from shore based weapons while rescuing the crew of the sunken ship and sustained damage to one of her small boats.

The ships loaded supplies like food, water and medicines at the island of Sint Maarten before continuing to the Bahamas.

See also

Citations

External links

 Rotterdam-class at defensie.nl
 Rotterdam at defensie.nl
 Johan de Witt at defensie.nl

Rotterdam-class landing platform docks
Amphibious warfare vessel classes
1997 ships
2006 ships